Hebeloma sinapizans, commonly known as the rough-stalked hebeloma or the bitter poisonpie, is a species of mushroom in the family Hymenogastraceae. It has a strong radish-like smell, and a prominent bulbous stem base. It is larger than the similar and more common H. crustuliniforme, a relative that is also poisonous. H. sinapizans is found in Europe and North America.

Taxonomy
First described as Hypophyllum sinapizans by Jean-Jacques Paulet in 1793, it was transferred to the genus Hebeloma by Claude Casimir Gillet in 1878. It is commonly known as the "rough-stalked Hebeloma".

Description
The cap may have a shallow umbo. The cap surface ranges from moist to sticky, and it is smooth with a margin that is first curled inward and expanding to become curled upward in maturity; the cap color is whitish-tan to cinnamon-tan, sometimes with pinkish- or reddish-brown tints. The flesh is whitish, thick, and has a radish-like odor and taste. Gills have an adnate attachment to the stipe, and they have a notch just before the point of attachment; the gill edges have tiny fringes or serrations. They are first whitish before turning to yellowish-brown to pale brown after the spores mature. Hebeloma sinapizans mushrooms are poisonous.

Fruit bodies produce a pale brown spore print. Spores are elliptical with a rough surface texture, and measure 10–14 by 6–8 µm.

Habitat and distribution
The fungus fruits on the ground in groups or fairy rings in deciduous and coniferous forests. As of December 2022, hebeloma.org lists collections from 20 countries across Europe as well as collections from Asiatic Turkey and Lebanon.

See also
List of Hebeloma species

References

sinapizans
Fungi described in 1793
Fungi of Europe
Fungi of North America
Fungi found in fairy rings